Earth Beams is a studio album recorded by noted jazz performers George Adams and Don Pullen as the George Adams/Don Pullen Quartet. Adams and Pullen had met through their work with composer and double-bassist Charles Mingus, who had died the year the Adams/Pullen Quartet began in 1979.

Reception
According to The Playboy Book of Jazz author Neil Tesser, "The participation of Dannie Richmond, Mingus's longtime drummer and protégé, only strengthened the sense that they were continuing on in Mingus's footsteps" and Earth Beams features screeching solos from Adams and "tightly wound chord clusters" from Pullen The Allmusic review by Steve Loewy awarded the album 3 stars stating "Some of the best moments come from the interaction between Pullen and Adams, whose legacies left an indelible imprint on late 20th century jazz".

Track listing
All compositions by George Adams except as indicated
 "Earth Beams" - 7:58
 "Magnetic Love Field" (George Adams, Don Pullen) - 4:38
 "Dionysus" (Dannie Richmond) - 7:33 	
 "Saturday Nite in the Cosmos" (Frank Dean, Don Pullen) - 6:47	
 "More Flowers" - 5:39
 "Sophisticated Alice" (Pullen) - 7:16

Personnel
George Adams - tenor saxophone, flute, producer
Don Pullen - organ, piano, producer
Dannie Richmond - drums
Cameron Brown - double bass

References

1980 albums
Timeless Records albums
Don Pullen albums
George Adams (musician) albums